Jack Thurin (born 9 June 1999) is a Swedish handball player for FC Porto and the Swedish national team.

He made international debut on the Swedish national team in March 2019.

He participated at the 2020 European Men's Handball Championship in Sweden.

Individual awards 

 All-Star Team Handbollsligan 2021/2022

References

1999 births
Living people
People from Skövde Municipality
Swedish male handball players
IFK Skövde players
Sportspeople from Västra Götaland County
Expatriate handball players
Swedish expatriate sportspeople in Portugal
FC Porto handball players